Alger Creek is a stream in Mono County, California, in the United States.

Alger Creek took its name from Alger Lakes.

See also
List of rivers of California

References

Rivers of Mono County, California
Rivers of Northern California